The 2009 Gael Linn Cup, the most important representative competition for elite level participants in the women's team field sport of camogie, was won by Munster, who defeated Connacht in the final, played at Ashbourne.

Arrangements
Ulster withdrew, so with just three entrants, the trophy was staged as a group series among Connacht, Leinster and Munster with games 15 minutes a half. Connacht represented by an all-Galway side and managed by former county hurler Liam Donoghue, managed to win both their matches in the group stages, beating Leinster, 2–3 to 0–8 and Munster 5–3 to 0–4. This tournament saw Galway star Veronica Curtin return to competitive action and her goals were a big factor against Leinster. She scored another goal against Munster with further goals from Brenda Hanney, Brenda Kerins, Therese Maher and Ann Marie Hayes. Munster defeated Leinster 2–2 to 0–2, then unexpectedly defeated Connacht in the final 0–7 to 0–2 with the adverse weather playing havoc with proceedings. Munster did the hard work against the wind in the first half to lead 0–4 to 0–1 at half-time, with Orla Cotter scoring three important points.

Gael Linn trophy
As with the senior competition, the trophy was staged as a group series among Connacht, Leinster and Munster with Connacht defeating Munster in the final 4–4 to 0–2. Niamh McGrath, Molly Dunne, Roscommon's Annette McGeeney and Stacey Coen scored Connacht's goals.

Final stages

|}

Junior Final

|}

References

External links
 Camogie Association

2009 in camogie
2009